Gertrude Richards Moreault (April 25, 1920 – April 4, 2008) was an American, Manhattan-born, 1950s jazz and swing singer.

She originally did background singing, and soon became lead vocalist with the Charlie Barnet band, with whom she recorded such songs as "Gloomy Sunday", "Easy Living" and "Ill Wind". She was signed by Decca Records as a solo artist, recording such songs as Nashville Blues and Blacksmith Blues with Sy Oliver.  She also recorded for Derby Records, MGM Records and Jubilee Records. She was signed as a solo artist on 
Capitol Records and released the album Crazy In Love! with Billy May's orchestra in 1957.  She worked with such musicians as Doc Severinsen, Maynard Ferguson, George Barnes, Pete Rugolo, Artie Shaw, and Dave McKenna, and performed at clubs including Freddy's, Jan Wallman's and La Chansonette.  Following her marriage to Henri Moreault, she relaunched her career as Trudy Richards Moreau for a second series of albums on such labels as Musicor Records, Black Swan, and Beekman Place. Her recording of Can't Help Lovin' Dat Man was used on The Adventures of Priscilla, Queen of the Desert (soundtrack).  She died on April 4, 2008 and was pre-deceased by her son Richard Shore. A CD compilation of her recordings was released in 2016.

Songs
The following is a list of songs recorded as singles by Richards.
Nashville Blues with Sy Oliver, Decca 24840
Hawaii/Wha'd'ya Say?, MGM 10728
I'll Never Love You/Somewhere, Somehow, Someday, MGM 10804
I'm Afraid to Love You/Winter Waltz, MGM 10831
I Am Loved/Where Oh Where, MGM 10863
I'll Be All Smiles Tonight/That's How Our Love Will Grow, MGM 10922
Blacksmith Blues/Any Time with Sy Oliver, Decca 27972
I Never Loved Anyone But You/I Don't Mind with Sy Oliver, Decca 28084I May Hate Myself in the Morning/I Waited a Little Too Long, Decca 28190I'm Never Satisfied/Some Folks Do and Some Folks Don't, Decca 28389A Fool/Go 'Way From My Window, Decca 28564The Breeze/Can't Love You Anymore, Derby 45-823Bye Bye Blackbird/I Believe What I Feel, Derby 45–830Sugar-Loaf Junction/T'aint Nobody's Bizness, Derby 45-847The Song is You/It's Been So Long with Pete Rugolo, Arco 1221Temptation/Travelin' Home, Capitol 3481Paradise/Once Upon a Dream, Capitol 3555Next Time/All of My Life, Capitol 3614Wishbone/Hangin' Around, Capitol 3694I Want a Big Butter and Egg Man/Weaker Than Wise, Capitol 3729The Night When Love Was Born/Somebody Just Like You, Capitol 3946Don't Rush Me/Promises, Promises, Jubilee 5197Mercy (Have Mercy)/Strangers, Jubilee 5209I Want You to Be My Baby/I'll Never Stop Loving You with Vincent Lopez, 18 Top Hits 15924 Hours a Day, Ronnex 1140My Boy Flat Top, Ronnex 1141

Albums
The following is a list of albums recorded by Richards.Crazy in Love, with Billy May, Capitol T838, rel. 1957Trudy, with Jimmy Wisner, Musicor MUS-2503, rel. 1977Trudy Richards Sings, with Dave McKenna, Black Swan BS-100, rel. 1984Manhattan Serenade, with Frank Owens, Jay Leonhart and Grady Tate, Beekman Place BPR-1001, rel. 1990Charlie Barnet—The Capitol Big Band Sessions'' (reissue), Capitol Jazz CDP 7243

References

2008 deaths
1920 births
American women jazz singers
American jazz singers
Capitol Records artists
Decca Records artists
MGM Records artists
Singers from New York City
People from Manhattan
Jazz musicians from New York (state)
20th-century American women
21st-century American women